The Sunyani Technical University (STU) (formally known as Sunyani Polytechnic) is a public tertiary institution in the Bono Region of Ghana. It is located northeast of Asufufu.

STU was established as a Technical Institute in 1967, as a non-tertiary institution, under the Ghana Education Service. It was subsequently upgraded to a Polytechnic in 1997 by the Government of Ghana, to run Higher National Diploma (HND) programmes. The Polytechnics Act, 2007  mandated the Polytechnics in Ghana to run and award Higher National Diploma (HND) Certificates, Diplomas and other higher degrees, subject to the approval of the Polytechnic Councils.

Faculty and departments 
Faculty of Applied Science & Technology

 Computer Science
 General Agriculture
 Hospitality & Tourism
 Pharmacy Technician

Faculty of Engineering

 Civil Engineering
 Electrical & Electronic Engineering
 Mechanical Engineering
 Materials Engineering

Faculty of Built Environment & Applied Art

 Building Technology
 Visual & Industrial Art
 Wood Technology

Faculty of Business & Management Studies

 Accountancy
 Communication Studies
 Marketing
 Procurement & Supply Chain Management
 Secretaryship & Management Studies

Programme 
 
B.Tech. Civil Engineering
B.Tech. Management
B.Tech Hospitality Management (Top-up)
B.Tech Accounting Technology (Top-up)
B.Tech Electrical and Electronic Engineering (Top-up)
B.Tech General Agriculture (Top-up)
HND Accountancy
B.Tech Mechanical Engineering (Top-up)
B.Tech Photonics Engineering
HND Computerized Accounting
B.Tech Procurement and Supply Chain Management (Top-up)
HND Dispensing Technician (Pharmacy Technician)
HND Ceramic Art
HND Interior Design and Technology
B.Tech Building Technology
B.Tech Industrial Art (Printing Option)
B.Tech Industrial Art (Textile Option)
HND Computer Science
HND Fashion Design Technology
B.Tech. Fashion Design
HND Information Communication Technology
HND Materials Engineering
HND Purchasing and Supply
HND Textile Design Technology

Cultural museum 
STU plans to build a cultural museum on the history of the former Brong Ahafo Region.

References

Polytechnics in Ghana
Sunyani
Educational institutions established in 1967
1967 establishments in Ghana